Forest Meadows is a census-designated place (CDP) in Calaveras County, California, United States. The population was 1,249 at the 2010 census, up from 1,197 at the 2000 census.

Geography Brice Station is not inside the Forest Meadows HOA.

Demographics

At the 2010 census Forest Meadows had a population of 1,249. The racial makeup of Forest Meadows was 1,198 (95.9%) White, 0 (0.0%) African American, 4 (0.3%) Native American, 14 (1.1%) Asian, 0 (0.0%) Pacific Islander, 7 (0.6%) from other races, and 26 (2.1%) from two or more races. Hispanic or Latino of any race were 60 people (4.8%).

The whole population lived in households, no one lived in non-institutionalized group quarters and no one was institutionalized.

There were 586 households, 81 (13.8%) had children under the age of 18 living in them, 367 (62.6%) were opposite-sex married couples living together, 39 (6.7%) had a female householder with no husband present, 11 (1.9%) had a male householder with no wife present.  There were 23 (3.9%) unmarried opposite-sex partnerships, and 7 (1.2%) same-sex married couples or partnerships. 138 households (23.5%) were one person and 74 (12.6%) had someone living alone who was 65 or older. The average household size was 2.13.  There were 417 families (71.2% of households); the average family size was 2.46.

The age distribution was 153 people (12.2%) under the age of 18, 72 people (5.8%) aged 18 to 24, 139 people (11.1%) aged 25 to 44, 466 people (37.3%) aged 45 to 64, and 419 people (33.5%) who were 65 or older.  The median age was 58.0 years. For every 100 females, there were 99.5 males.  For every 100 females age 18 and over, there were 95.0 males.

There were 845 housing units at an average density of ,of which 586 were occupied, 488 (83.3%) by the owners and 98 (16.7%) by renters.  The homeowner vacancy rate was 5.4%; the rental vacancy rate was 7.4%.  1,030 people (82.5% of the population) lived in owner-occupied housing units and 219 people (17.5%) lived in rental housing units.

Politics 

References

External links

Census-designated places in Calaveras County, California
Census-designated places in California